Ruth Edith Tuck  (22 July 1914 – 10 October 2008) was a modernist painter of South Australia, noted for joint exhibitions with her husband Mervyn Ashmore Smith (11 December 1904 – 18 March 1994), and her influence as a teacher of painting. She was related to the better-known Marie Tuck.

History
Ruth Tuck was born at Cowell, South Australia, a daughter of Arthur Edward Tuck (1855 – 8 April 1925) and his wife Minnie née Wallis.

She studied painting under Dorrit Black and exhibited regularly with the Royal South Australian Society of Arts and was a foundation member of the Contemporary Art Society.

She met Mervyn Smith in 1943 and married him on 15 October the same year; they lived in Adelaide, then Mervyn moved to Newcastle, New South Wales in 1949, where he was employed as a County Council planning officer; she joined him few years later. In 1953 they returned to Adelaide, where they remained and held numerous joint exhibitions of their watercolors, both modernist in outlook with Mervyn's work being generally characterised as the more ambitious.

Her written work includes biographies of Mary Packer Harris and Marie Anne Tuck for the Australian Dictionary of Biography.

Ruth established the Ruth Tuck Art School in 1955; it continues to this day in Burnside, South Australia. She was awarded the Order of Australia medal in 1981 for services to art.

Family
Ruth was a granddaughter of noted Baptist minister Rev. Henry Lewer Tuck (11 September 1820 – 26 August 1880), an early immigrant to South Australia, whose brother Edward Starkey Tuck (13 March 1827 – 9 August 1898) was the father of Marie Tuck (5 September 1866 – 3 September 1947). See her article for more details of the Tuck family in South Australia.

Ruth had a son Mark in 1945 and twin daughters Michele and Angela in 1953.

For further information on the family see Tuck family.

References 

Australian painters
Australian women painters
Australian art teachers
1914 births
2008 deaths